Reflections is a 1999 documentary film tracing the lives of three individuals who migrated to Britain from the West Indies in search of a better life.

Film
Reflections was filmed on location in St Kitts, Nevis and Birmingham, England

Martina Mavis Clark from Jamaica, James Herbert from Nevis and Guyanese Edwin Ho, talk openly about early life in Birmingham where they experienced extreme hardship, racial abuse and family loss.

Now in his 80s, ex-boxer Edwin Ho is exceptional as he is able to pinpoint exactly where his cabin was located on the ship HMT Empire Windrush. Reflections Includes rare archive material of Birmingham in the 1940s and 50s.

Reflections provides excellent resource material for debate during Black History Month and associated events.

A segment of the film can be viewed on OOM Gallery.

External links
Film clip of Reflections

1999 films
British short documentary films
Documentary films about immigration
Immigration to the United Kingdom
1999 documentary films
1990s short documentary films
1999 short films
1990s English-language films
1990s British films